Robert Charles Stuart  (28 October 1920 – 11 May 2005) was a New Zealand rugby union player and administrator. He was given a lifetime service award by the International Rugby Board immediately after the 2003 Rugby World Cup.

Biography
Born in Dunedin, Stuart was educated at St Kevin's College, Oamaru and at Massey Agricultural College in Palmerston North, where he honed his rugby skills and became an agricultural economist.

During World War II, Stuart served as a lieutenant in the Fleet Air Arm on patrol on corvettes in the Atlantic.

A loose forward, Stuart briefly represented  at a provincial level in 1941, and, after the war,  from 1947 until 1953. He was a member of the New Zealand national side, the All Blacks, from 1949 to 1954, playing in 27 matches, including seven internationals. He captained the All Blacks on their 1953–54 tour of Britain, Ireland, France and North America.

In 1956, Stuart was a coaching advisor for the All Blacks during the South African tour of New Zealand, and between 1958 and 1959 he was one of the two selector–coaches of the Canterbury provincial side. From 1974 to 1989, he was a member of the New Zealand Rugby Union board, and he served as a New Zealand delegate to the International Rugby Board from 1978.

In the 1974 New Year Honours, Stuart was appointed an Officer of the Order of the British Empire, for services to agriculture and sport.

Stuart died in Wellington on 11 May 2005, and was buried at Mākara Cemetery.

References

1920 births
2005 deaths
Rugby union players from Dunedin
People educated at St Kevin's College, Oamaru
New Zealand rugby union players
New Zealand international rugby union players
Manawatu rugby union players
Fleet Air Arm personnel of World War II
Royal Navy officers
Massey University alumni
Canterbury rugby union players
Rugby union flankers
New Zealand rugby union coaches
New Zealand Rugby Football Union officials
New Zealand Officers of the Order of the British Empire
Burials at Makara Cemetery
Royal Navy officers of World War II